Sarbjit Singh Chadha (born 17 June 1952 in New Delhi, India) is an Indian singer, who is said to be the first non-Japanese enka singer. He went to Japan to study the agricultural industry, and there he began to prefer enka. He earned popularity via the Japanese television program Kinyō 10 Ji: Uwasa no Channel. He debuted as an enka singer with the single  under JVC in 1975. The single reportedly sold over 100,000 copies. He soon returned to India because of a visa problem. However, he returned to Japan in 2008.

Discography
 – Greatest-hits album under JVC (17 December 2008)

References

External links
Official Website 

1952 births
Living people
Enka singers
Indian male singers
Indian expatriates in Japan
Japanese-language singers
Punjabi people
Indian Sikhs